Jeffrey Friedman may refer to:

 Jeffrey Friedman (filmmaker) (born 1951), American film director and producer
 Jeffrey Friedman (political scientist) (1959–2022), American political scientist and editor
 Jeffrey Friedman (politician) (1945–2007), American politician serving as mayor of Austin, Texas in the 1970s
 Jeffrey M. Friedman (born 1954), molecular geneticist